The American Journal of Chinese Studies is a peer-reviewed academic journal published by the American Association for Chinese Studies. It covers research in all social science disciplines "dealing with Taiwan, China and locales with significant Chinese population or influence."

Abstracting and indexing 
The journal is abstracted and indexed in
 America: History & Life
 Historical Abstracts
 International Political Science Abstracts
 Bibliography of Asian Studies
 MLA Bibliography

See also 
 Chiang Ching-kuo Foundation

References

External links 
 

Chinese studies journals
Biannual journals
English-language journals